Oriani is an Italian surname. Notable people with the surname include:

 Alfredo Oriani (1852–1909), Italian author
 Barnaba Oriani, Italian priest and astronomer
 Carlo Oriani, Italian cyclist
 Constanza Oriani, Argentine fencer
 Mario Oriani-Ambrosini, Italian-American lawyer
 Richard Oriani, American chemist

See also
 4540 Oriani, main-belt asteroid
 Oriani class destroyer, Italian-made ship

Italian-language surnames